The Ireland national badminton team represents Ireland in international badminton team competitions. The national team is controlled by Badminton Ireland, the governing body for badminton in Ireland. Ireland has made multiple appearances in the Sudirman Cup. The team's best result was reaching the quarterfinals at the 2015 European Mixed Team Badminton Championships.

Former national player, Sam Magee was appointed as the main doubles coach while former Malaysian player, Iskandar Zulkarnain was appointed as the national team's singles coach.

Participation in BWF competitions

Sudirman Cup

Participation in European Team Badminton Championships

Men's Team

Women's Team

Mixed Team

Participation in Helvetia Cup 
The Helvetia Cup or European B Team Championships was a European mixed team championship in badminton. The first Helvetia Cup tournament took place in Zurich, Switzerland in 1962. The tournament took place every two years from 1971 until 2007, after which it was dissolved.

Participation in European Junior Team Badminton Championships
Mixed Team

Current squad 
The following players were selected to represent Ireland at the 2020 European Men's and Women's Team Badminton Championships.

Male players
Nhat Nguyen
Jonathan Dolan
Joshua Magee
Sam Magee
Paul Reynolds

Female players
Sara Boyle
Rachel Darragh
Kate Frost
Chloe Magee
Moya Ryan

References

Badminton
National badminton teams
Badminton in Ireland